Louise Stahle (born 19 March 1985) is a professional golf player who has played on both the U.S.-based LPGA Tour and the Ladies European Tour. She won the British Ladies Amateur back-to-back in 2004 and 2005

Early years
Stahle was born in Lund, Sweden, in a family with a strong golfing background. She started playing golf at the age of nine and practiced golf and other sports during summer vacations. Tennis has been her second sport. Her father Oscar Stahle and her uncle Fredrik Stahle were both among the best amateur players in Sweden in the 1970s. Fredrik won the 1977 Swedish Junior Stroke-play Championship and represented Sweden twice in the European Youths' Team Championship.

Amateur career
Stahle had a very successful amateur career. In 2002, at 17 years of age, she won the French International Lady Juniors Amateur Championship as well as the Swedish Junior Match-play Championship and was a member of the European Junior Solheim Cup team. In 2003, she was again member of the European Junior Solheim Cup team, this time on the winning side and in her native Sweden.

In 2004, she won the St Rule Trophy at St Andrews, Scotland, the Beirut Café Ladies Trophy on the Swedish Golf Tour (at the time named the Telia Tour) and won the Smyth Salver as leading amateur at the Weetabix Women's British Open. However, her greatest achievement of the year came when she became the first Swede to win the British Ladies Amateur, when she won at Gullane No 1 in Scotland. She was part of the winning Swedish Team at the 2004 Espirito Santo Trophy together with Sofie Andersson and Karin Sjödin.

Stahle played collegiate golf 2004-2005 at Arizona State University, where she had one of the finest freshman seasons in school history. She had four runner-up performances and three victories in 10 tournaments, including wins at the Wildcat Invitational and PING/ASU Invitational. She was named National Golf Coaches Association Eleanor Dudley Division I Player of the Year and Freshman of the Year as well as being named to All-American First team and Scholar team. She was Pac-10 Golfer of the Year and Freshman of the Year, won the Pac-10 championship and was named All-Pac-10 first team. She also won the Golfstat Cup, which is given to the player who has the best scoring average versus par with at least 20 full rounds played during a season.

Stahle became the first player in 30 years to successfully defend the Ladies' British Amateur title, when she won again in 2005, this time at Littlestone, Scotland.

Playing as an amateur at the 2005 Weetabix Women's British Open, she was placed lone second after two rounds. She did not have the possibility to win any prize money, but her invitation to the major championship, as reigning British Amateur champion, was conditioned to the fact that she played as an amateur. After finishing tied eighth in the tournament, two strokes from second place, Stahle turned professional.

Professional career
Stahle made her professional debut at the 2005 Scandinavian TPC hosted by Annika at her home club, Barsebäck Golf & Country Club in Sweden, finishing 15th. She gained exempt status for the 2006 LPGA Tour season by finishing tied for 11th at the LPGA Final Qualifying Tournament.

From 2006 to 2011, she played in 56 LPGA Tour tournaments with an 8th-place finish at the 2009 Sybase Classic as her best result. In 2006, Louise secured her playing rights at the Ladies European Tour (LET) and played 49 tournaments between 2007 and 2012. Runner-up finishes at the 2007 Ladies Open of Portugal and the 2008 Ladies German Open were her best results. In 2015, Stahle re-entered both the LPGA Tour and Ladies European Tour after successfully completing both qualifying schools.

Amateur wins
2002 Swedish Junior Matchplay Championship, French International Lady Juniors Amateur Championship
2004 St Rule Trophy, British Ladies Amateur
2005 British Ladies Amateur

Professional wins (2)

Swedish Golf Tour wins (2)

Results in LPGA majors
Results not in chronological order.

^ The Evian Championship was added as a major in 2013 

LA = Low amateur
CUT = missed the half-way cut
"T" = tied

Source:

Team appearances
Amateur
European Girls' Team Championship (representing Sweden): 2002, 2003
Junior Solheim Cup (representing Europe): 2002, 2003 (winners)
Espirito Santo Trophy (representing Sweden): 2004 (winners)
European Ladies' Team Championship (representing Sweden): 2005
Sources:

Notes and references

External links

Swedish female golfers
Winners of ladies' major amateur golf championships
Ladies European Tour golfers
LPGA Tour golfers
Arizona State Sun Devils women's golfers
Sportspeople from Lund
Golfers from Scottsdale, Arizona
1985 births
Living people